Judith C. Brown is a historian and a Professor Emerita of History at Wesleyan University. A specialist on the Italian Renaissance, she is considered a pioneer in the study of the history of sexuality whose work explored the earliest recorded examples of lesbian relationships in European history.

Academic career 
Brown holds a B.A. and M.A. from the University of California, Berkeley as well as a Ph.D. from Johns Hopkins University. In addition to her career as a faculty member at UMBC and Stanford, Rice, and Wesleyan universities, she has been Dean of the School of Humanities at Rice and Vice-President for Academic Affairs and Provost at Wesleyan. She was also the former Dean of the College of Arts and Humanities at Minerva University in San Francisco.

Currently, Brown is an Emeritus Professor of History at Wesleyan University.

Achievements 
Brown has received numerous fellowships and awards, including fellowships at the Center for Advanced Study in the Behavioral Sciences, the Stanford Humanities Center, I Tatti (the Harvard Center for Italian Renaissance Studies), as well as grants and fellowships from the Guggenheim Foundation, the Pew Foundation, the American Council of Learned Societies, and others.

Her 1986 book Immodest Acts: The Life of a Lesbian Nun in Renaissance Italy was adapted for the screen in 2021 as Benedetta by director Paul Verhoeven.

Scholarly interests 
A feminist historian of early modern Europe and Renaissance Italy, Brown’s scholarly interests include issues in higher education and the history of women, gender and sexuality.

Works

Books

Articles

Essays

Reviews

References

Further reading
  (Interview)
 
  (Review of Immodest Acts: The Life of a Lesbian Nun in Renaissance Italy)

External links
 
  Judith C. Brown at Wesleyan University
  Judith C. Brown at Google Scholar
  Judith C. Brown biography at The Living Room, Matt & Andrej Koymasky

20th-century births
Living people
American women historians
American women writers
Feminist theorists
Radical feminists
Wesleyan University faculty
Year of birth missing (living people)